Aa is a genus of plants of the family Orchidaceae.

Species in this genus can be found growing terrestrially in cold habitats near the snowline in the Andes and also in Costa Rica; they are usually found close to small streams. The elongated inflorescence grows from a basal rosette of leaves, terminating in a small white non-resupinate flower. This lip is fringed and hood-shaped. The flower gives off a pungent smell that attracts flies. This genus has often been included in the orchid genus Altensteinia.

The first scientific description of a species of this genus was made in 1815 by Karl Sigismund Kunth, naming it first Ophrys paleacea Kunth (1806)., and later Altensteinia paleacea. In 1854 Heinrich Gustav Reichenbach separated Aa from Altensteinia, to include two species Aa argyrolepis and Aa paleacea. The genus name apparently was rendered by the author to always appear first in alphabetical listings. Another - disputed - explanation, is that Heinrich Gustav Reichenbach named this genus after Pieter van der Aa; the printer of the Dutch botanist Paul Herman's "Paradisus Batavus". A few years later, Reichenbach reviewed the name of the genus and named it again Altensteinia. Finally in 1912 Rudolf Schlechter switched the name again to Aa, as more species were being discovered making the new name more significant.

Species
The following species of Aa are accepted
Aa achalensis Schltr. 1920 (Argentina)
Aa argyrolepis Rchb.f. 1854 (Colombia to Ecuador)
Aa aurantiaca D.Trujillo (Peru)
Aa calceata (Rchb.f.) Schltr. 1912 (Peru to Bolivia)
Aa colombiana Schltr. 1920 (Colombia to Ecuador)
Aa denticulata Schltr. 1920 (Colombia to Ecuador)
Aa erosa (Rchb.f.) Schltr. 1912 (Peru)
Aa fiebrigii (Schltr.) Schltr. 1912 (Bolivia)
Aa figueroi Szlach. & S. Nowak, 2014 
Aa hieronymi (Cogn.) Schltr. 1912 (Argentina)
Aa lehmannii Rchb. f. ex Szlach. & Kolan., 2014
Aa leucantha (Rchb.f.) Schltr. 1920 (Colombia to Ecuador)
Aa lorentzii Schltr. 1920 (Argentina)
Aa lozanoi Szlach. & S. Nowak, 2014 
Aa macra Schltr. 1921 (Ecuador)
Aa maderoi Schltr. 1920 (Venezuela; Colombia; Ecuador)
Aa mandonii (Rchb.f.) Schltr. 1912 (Peru to Bolivia)
Aa matthewsii (Rchb.f.) Schltr. 1912 (Peru)
Aa microtidis Schltr. 1922 (Bolivia)
Aa paleacea (Kunth) Rchb.f. 1854 (Costa Rica to Bolivia)
Aa riobambae Schltr. 1921 (Ecuador)
Aa rosei Ames 1922 (Peru)
Aa schickendanzii Schltr. 1920 (Argentina)
Aa sphaeroglossa Schltr. 1922 (Bolivia)
Aa trilobulata Schltr. 1922 (Bolivia)
Aa weddelliana (Rchb.f.) Schltr. 1912 (Peru to NW Argentina)
Synonyms: 
Aa hartwegii Garay 1978 (Ecuador; Colombia; Venezuela); syn., → Aa maderoi Schltr.,
Aa gymnandra (Rchb.f.) Schltr. 1912 a synonym of Myrosmodes gymnandra (Rchb.f.) C.A.Vargas
Aa inaequalis (Rchb.f.) Schltr. 1912 (Peru to Bolivia);  a synonym of Myrosmodes inaequalis (Rchb.f.) C.A.Vargas
Aa nervosa (Kraenzl.) Schltr. 1912 (Chile); accepted name Myrosmodes nervosa (Kraenzl.) Novoa, C.A.Vargas & Cisternas

References 

 W.E. Higgins (2006): Selby Vignette: The Aa's of Orchids. 
 H.G. Reichenbach. 1854. Xenia Orchidaceae. 1:18.
 R. Schlechter (1912): Repertorium specierum novarum regni vegetabilis. Bd. XI S. 147ff.

External links 
 
 
 Pictures of Chilean Aa nervosa orchid

 
Cranichideae genera
Neotropical realm flora